August Mau (15 October 1840 – 6 March 1909) was a prominent German art historian and archaeologist who worked with the Deutsches Archäologisches Institut while studying and classifying the Roman paintings at Pompeii, which was destroyed with the town of Herculaneum by volcanic eruption in 79 AD. The paintings were in remarkably good condition due to the preservation by the volcanic ash that covered the city. Mau first divided these paintings into the four Pompeian Styles still used as a classification.

Mau was born in Kiel, where he read Classical Philology at the University of Kiel, and then at the University of Bonn. He moved to Rome, for reasons of ill-health, in 1872, where he became Secretary to the German Archaeological Institute and catalogued the holdings of its extensive library. His interests lay above all in Pompeii, with inscriptions and Roman wall paintings, where he built upon the earlier work published by Wolfgang Helbig and Giuseppe Fiorelli.

Mau died in Rome in 1909.

Publications
 Pompejanische Beiträge. Reimer, Berlin 1879
 Geschichte der decorativen Wandmalerei in Pompeji. Reimer, Berlin 1882.
 Führer durch Pompeji. Furchheim, Naples 1893
 Pompeji in Leben und Kunst. Engelmann, Leipzig 1900
 Katalog der Bibliothek des Kaiserlich Deutschen Archäologischen Instituts in Rom. Löscher, Rome In parts, 1913–1932,

Further reading
 Reinhard Lullies (ed.): Archäologenbildnisse. Porträts und Kurzbiographien von klassischen Archäologen deutscher Sprache. (Zabern, Mainz) 1988.

External links
 
 

1840 births
1909 deaths
German art historians
Archaeologists from Schleswig-Holstein
Academic staff of the University of Bonn
German male non-fiction writers
Writers from Kiel